Gerry Mulligan Meets Ben Webster, also simply called Meets Ben Webster, is a 1960 album featuring the November 3 - December 2 studio sessions of American jazz musicians Gerry Mulligan and Ben Webster. In a 2003 review, All That Jazz described this album as the most significant of Gerry Mulligan's work partnering other legendary figures of jazz. The album, as a "classic album from two giants", is featured in NPR's "Basic Jazz Record Library". Originally released on the Verve label, the album was reissued by the label many times (as well as by Mobile Fidelity) before being re-released in an expanded edition called Gerry Mulligan Meets Ben Webster (Complete) by Verve in 1997.

In 2000, it was voted number 448 in Colin Larkin's All Time Top 1000 Albums. He stated it is "a fine example of how two seemingly disparate musicians can perform together superbly."

1960 track listing
Except where otherwise indicated, all songs composed by Gerry Mulligan.
"Chelsea Bridge" (Billy Strayhorn) – 7:22
"The Cat Walk" (Mulligan, Ben Webster) – 5:47
"Sunday" (Chester Conn, Bennie Krueger, Nathan "Ned" Miller, Jule Styne) – 7:25
"Who's Got Rhythm" – 7:42
"Tell Me When" – 5:06
"Go Home" – 10:04

CD bonus tracks
"In a Mellow Tone" (Duke Ellington, Milt Gabler) – 6:57
"What Is This Thing Called Love?" (Cole Porter) – 7:28
"For Bessie" (Webster) – 5:41
"Fajista" (Webster) – 5:50 
"Blues in B Flat" – 7:22

1997 "Complete" track listing"
Except where otherwise noted, all songs composed by Gerry Mulligan.
"In a Mellow Tone" (Ellington, Gabler) – 7:20
"In a Mellow Tone (alternate take)" (Ellington, Gabler) – 5:44
"What Is This Thing Called Love?" (Porter) – 7:22
"Chelsea Bridge (original LP master take)" (Strayhorn) – 7:39
"Chelsea Bridge (alternate take)" (Strayhorn) – 5:03
"Go Home (alternate take)" – 10:01
"Go Home (original LP master take)" – 6:54
"Who's Got Rhythm? (original LP master take)" – 7:26
"For Bessie" (Webster) – 5:38
"Go Home" (Mulligan, Webster) – 1:44
"Go Home" (Mulligan, Webster) – 1:30
"Fajista (alternate take)" (Webster) – 1:34 
"Fajista (alternate take)" (Webster) – 6:21
"Fajista (alternate take)" (Webster) – 1:37
"Fajista" (Webster) – 5:58 
"Tell Me When" – 5:02
"Tell Me When (alternate take)" – 5:29
"Blues in B Flat (alternate take)" – 2:46
"Blues in B Flat" – 8:38  
"Blues in B Flat (alternate take)" – 7:23 
"The Catwalk (alternate take)" – 3:26
"The Catwalk (alternate take)" – 5:45
"The Catwalk (original LP master take)" – 2:13 
"The Catwalk (alternate take)" – 6:19
"Sunday" (Conn, Krueger, Miller, Styne) – 5:32
"Sunday" (Conn, Krueger, Miller, Styne) – 7:21

Personnel
Mel Lewis - drums
Gerry Mulligan - baritone saxophone
Jimmy Rowles - piano
Leroy Vinnegar - double bass
Ben Webster - tenor saxophone
Norman Granz - producer
Phil Schaap - liner notes

References

Verve Records albums
Gerry Mulligan albums
Ben Webster albums
1960 albums
Albums produced by Norman Granz